The Roman Catholic Diocese of Norcia was a Latin Catholic bishopric, which existed twice (c490-1000 and 1821-1986) with episcopal see in Norcia, Perugia Province, Umbria region of central Italy.

History 
 Established in 490 as Diocese of Norcia / Nursin(us) (Latin) without explicit precursor.
 Suppressed circa 1000?, its territory being merged into the then Diocese of Spoleto.
 Restored on 1821.09.15 as Diocese of Norcia / Nursin(us) (Latin), on territory split off again from the meanwhile promoted exempt Archdiocese of Spoleto.
 Lost territory on 1984.03.19 to the Archdiocese of Camerino.
 Suppressed on 1986.09.30, its territory and title being merged into the thus renamed Roman Catholic Archdiocese of Spoleto-Norcia.

Special churches 
 Its former Cathedral became Spoleto-Norcia's Co-Cathedral: Concattedrale di S. Maria Argentea, in Norcia, but was destroyed by an earthquake on 2016.10.30.
 Furthermore it left a Minor Basilica, dedicated to Saint Benedict : Basilica di S. Benedetto, Norcia

Episcopal ordinaries 
(all Roman Rite Italians)
 no incumbents from the first millennium available

Suffragan Bishops of Norcia (restored)
 Gaetano Bonanni (1821.06.27 – 1843)
 Letterio Turchi (1843.04.03 – 1850.05.20), next Bishop of Città di Castello (Italy) (1850.05.20 – death 1861.11.08)
 Raffaele Bacchettoni (1850.05.20 – retired 1880.11.27?); emeritate as Titular Bishop of Myrina (1880.12.13 – death 1881)
 Domenico Bucchi-Accica (1880.12.13 – 1889.12.30), previously Titular Bishop of Lystra (1873.12.22 – 1880.12.13), later Bishop of Orvieto (Italy) (1889.12.30 – 1905)
 Mariano Cavasci, Capuchin Friars Minor (O.F.M. Cap.) (1890.06.23 – retired 1895.03.18); emeritate as Titular Archbishop of Scythopolis (1895.03.18 – death 1899.02.09)
 Nicola Ranieri, O.F.M. (1895.03.18 – death 1905)
 Ercolano Marini (1905.12.11 – 1915.06.02); previously Titular Bishop of Archelaïs (1904.06.29 – 1905.12.11) as Auxiliary Bishop of Spoleto (Italy) (1904.06.29 – 1905.12.11); later Archbishop of Amalfi (Italy) (1915.06.02 – retired 1945.10.27), emeritate as first Titular Archbishop of Aprus (1945.10.03 – 1945.10.27), then Titular Archbishop of Adana (1945.10.27 – death 1950.11.16)
 Vincenzo Migliorelli (1916.07.11 – 1927.08.10); later Bishop of Treia (Italy) (1927.08.10 – 1930.02.27), Bishop of San Severino (Italy) (1927.08.10 – retired 1930.02.27), emeritate as Titular Bishop of Samos (1930.02.27 – death 1939.02.24)
 Settimio Peroni (1928.12.17 – retired 1951.02.01); emeritate as Titular Archbishop of Viminacium (1951.02.01 – death 1958.10.12)
 Ilario Roatta (1951.03.27 – 1960.03.08); next Bishop of Sant’Agata de’ Goti (Italy) (1960.03.08 – retired 1982.01.02), died 1991
 Alberto Scola (1960.03.28 – retired 1972.05.13), died 1982
 Giuliano Agresti (1972.05.13 – 1973.03.25); also Archbishop of Spoleto (Italy) (1969.11.07 – 1973.03.25); later Archbishop of Lucca (Italy) (1973.03.25 – 1990.09.18)
 Ottorino Pietro Alberti (1973.08.09 – 1986.09.30), also last Archbishop of Spoleto (Italy) (1973.08.09 – 1986.09.30), restyled first Archbishop of successor see Spoleto–Norcia (1986.09.30 – 1987.11.23); later Metropolitan Archbishop of Cagliari (Sardinia, Italy) (1987.11.23 – retired 2003.06.20), died 2012.

See also 
 List of Catholic dioceses in Italy

Sources and external links 
 GCatholic with Google satellite photo - data for all sections
 with Google satellite photo/map - former cathedral

Former Roman Catholic dioceses in Italy
Roman Catholic dioceses in Umbria